The Official Secrets Act 1889 (52 & 53 Vict. c. 52) was an Act of the Parliament of the United Kingdom. It created offences of disclosure of information (section 1) and breach of official trust (section 2). It was replaced in the UK by the Official Secrets Act 1911.

The Official Secrets Bill began its parliamentary procedures on 10 May 1888, achieving its royal assent on 26 August 1889. It was initiated by Lord George Hamilton PC First Lord of the Admiralty and Edward Stanhope (PC) Secretary of State for War. The bill was enacted by the Attorney General Richard Webster to give increased powers against offences of disclosing confidential matters by officials, and to prevent the disclosure of such documents and information by spies, and/or to prevent breaches of official trust, in order to punish such offences of obtaining information and communicating it, against the interests of the British state.

Disclosure of information

Breach of official trust

Punishment for inciting or counselling to commit offence

Expenses of prosecution

Saving for laws of British possessions

Extent of act and place of trial of offence

Restriction on prosecution

Interpretations

Saving

Short title

Parliamentary procedures and debates

Bill 256
 10 May 1888. First Reading: http://hansard.millbanksystems.com/commons/1888/may/10/official-secrets-bill
 7 June 1888. Second Reading: http://hansard.millbanksystems.com/commons/1888/jun/07/second-reading-1
 4 August 1888. Commons Debate: http://hansard.millbanksystems.com/commons/1888/aug/04/east-india-hyderabad-deccan-mining#S3V0329P0_18880804_HOC_24

Bill 97
 25 February 1889. Commons Debate: http://hansard.millbanksystems.com/commons/1889/feb/25/official-secrets-bill
 28 March 1889. Second Reading: http://hansard.millbanksystems.com/commons/1889/mar/28/second-reading-1
 15 April 1889. Commons Debate: http://hansard.millbanksystems.com/commons/1889/apr/15/official-secrets-bill-no-47
 16 April 1889. Third Reading: http://hansard.millbanksystems.com/commons/1889/apr/16/third-reading
 29 April 1889. Commons Debate: http://hansard.millbanksystems.com/commons/1889/apr/29/supply-civil-service-estimates#S3V0335P0_18890429_HOC_140
 2 May 1889. Commons Debate: http://hansard.millbanksystems.com/commons/1889/may/02/official-secrets-bill-no-97
 23 May 1889. Commons Debate: http://hansard.millbanksystems.com/commons/1889/may/23/official-secrets-bill-no-97
 17 June 1889. Commons Debate: http://hansard.millbanksystems.com/commons/1889/jun/17/official-secrets-bill-no-97

Bill 274
 20 June 1889. Commons Debate: http://hansard.millbanksystems.com/commons/1889/jun/20/official-secrets-bill-no-274

Bill 112
 21 June 1889. Lords Debate: http://hansard.millbanksystems.com/lords/1889/jun/21/official-secrets-bill
 11 July 1889. Lords Debate: http://hansard.millbanksystems.com/lords/1889/jul/11/official-secrets-bill-no-112
 6 August 1889. Committee Stage: http://hansard.millbanksystems.com/lords/1889/aug/06/committee-of-selection-for-standing
 12 August 1889. Lords Debate: http://hansard.millbanksystems.com/lords/1889/aug/12/official-secrets-bill-no-112
 15 August 1889. Lords Debate: http://hansard.millbanksystems.com/lords/1889/aug/15/official-secrets-bill-no-112
 16 August 1889. Lords Debate: http://hansard.millbanksystems.com/lords/1889/aug/16/official-secrets-bill-no-112

Bill 382
 17 August 1889. Commons Debate: http://hansard.millbanksystems.com/commons/1889/aug/17/official-secrets-bill-no-382

Bill 232
 22 August 1889. Order of Business: http://hansard.millbanksystems.com/commons/1889/aug/22/order-of-business
 22 August 1889. Commons Debate: http://hansard.millbanksystems.com/commons/1889/aug/22/official-secrets-bill-no-882
 23 August 1889. Lords Debate: http://hansard.millbanksystems.com/lords/1889/aug/23/official-secrets-bill-no-232
 26 August 1889. Royal Assent: http://hansard.millbanksystems.com/commons/1889/aug/26/royal-assent

See also
Official Secrets Act
Official Secrets Act 1911 
Official Secrets Act 1920
Official Secrets Act 1939
Official Secrets Act 1989

References

United Kingdom Acts of Parliament 1889
Classified information in the United Kingdom